The Thopia family was one of the most powerful Albanian feudal families in the Late Middle Ages. It was initially part of the nobility of the Angevin Kingdom of Albania.

Early history
The first attestation of the Thopia can be found in an Angevin document from 1274 proclaiming an agreement reached between a number of Albanian nobles and Charles I of Anjou. In the document, a certain Theopia mīles is recorded among the Albanian nobles in pact with the Angevins. The Thopia are next mentioned in 1329 when Tanusio Thopia was mentioned as one of the counts of Albania. In 1338, Tanusio was mentioned as Count of Matia (conte di Matia). According to Anamali & Prifti, Tanusio had a brother, Dominik, who was a high cleric and served as a counsel of Robert of Anjou.

According to Karl Hopf, Tanusio's son or brother Andrea, as told by Gjon Muzaka (fl. 1510), had fallen in love with the daughter of Robert of Naples when her ship, en route to the Principality of the Morea to be wed with the bailli, had stopped at Durazzo where they met. Andrea abducted and married her, and they had two sons, Karl and George. King Robert, enraged, under the pretext of reconciliation had the couple invited to Naples where he had them executed.

The family converted from Eastern Orthodoxy to Catholicism.

By 1340 the Thopia controlled much of the territory between the rivers Mati and Shkumbin rivers. Together with the Muzaka family, they agreed to recognize Angevin suzerainty after rebelling against the Serbs. However except for Andrea Muzaka who defeated the Serbs in a battle in the Peristeri mountains, no action was taken to realize the treaty with the Angevins.

Karl Thopia

 
Under Karl Thopia the family reached its zenith. After the death of Emperor Stefan Dušan (1355), Karl managed to capture much of central Albania which was part of the Serbian Empire until then. In 1362 his forces attacked the city of Durrës, then in Angevin hands. Although he couldn't capture the city, he forced them to pay an annual tribute to his family. In 1368 Karl managed to capture the city of Durrës.  Around 1370 Karl attacked the dominions of the Muzaka family and managed to capture from them the territory between Shkumbin and Seman. Now the territory of Thopia extended from Mat river to Seman, reaching its maximum extension. This aggressive behavior brought a complicated situation and many enemies. In 1376 Louis of Évreux, Duke of Durazzo who had gained the rights on the Albanian Kingdom from his second wife, attacked and conquered the city. However, in 1383, Karl Thopia took control of the city again.

Muzaka family allied with Balša II against Thopia. In the beginning of 1385, the city of Durrës was captured by Balša II in a surprise attack. Karl called for Ottoman help and Balša’s forces were defeated in the Battle of Savra. Thopia recaptured the city of Durrës the same year and held it until his death in 1388. Afterwards, the city of Durrës was inherited by his son Gjergj, Lord of Durrës. In 1392 Gjergj surrendered the city of Durrës and his domains to the Venice.

After Karl
After the death of Karl, his dominion was divided between his daughter Helena Thopia and his son Gjergj Thopia. Gjergj kept the city of Durrës and his surroundings which he later surrendered to Venice Republic, while Helen Thopia kept the city of Krujë and its surroundings. She was married to Venetian nobleman Marco Barbarigo. The count Niketa Thopia, a cousin of Gjergj, ruled in the region south of Durrës. In 1403, Niketa Thopia managed to capture the city of Krujë from his cousin Helena, thus gaining another part of the territory previously held by Thopia. He had good relations with Venice which was interested in having some buffer zone between them and advancing Ottoman army. However, in 1411, Niketa Thopia suffered a heavy defeat from the forces of Teodor III Muzaka. He himself fell prisoner and with the intervention of Ragusan Republic he was released, but only after giving some territories around Shkumbin river to Muzaka family. Upon his death in 1415, the castle of Krujë fell to the Ottomans.

Later representatives
Later well known representatives include Tanush Thopia a famous commander of Skanderbeg army and the commander of Krujë garrison during Second Siege of Krujë.

Members

Tanusio, Count of Matia (1328–38), one son
Andrea I Thopia, married illegitimate daughter of Robert I of Naples, both were murdered by Robert, two sons
Karl (or Carlo), married Vojislava Balšić, in c. 1370., three children. Karl had seven children in total
George (fl. 1388–d. 1392), Lord of Durazzo, married Teodora Branković, no issue
Helena (fl. 1388–1403), married Venetian count Marco Barbadigo (first marriage) and lord Konstantin Balšić (second marriage), one son with Konstantin Balšić
Stefan Maramonte (fl. 1419-40), Zetan nobleman, married Vlajka Kastrioti
Vojsava, married N Cursachio (first marriage) and in 1394, Progon Dukagjini, Lord of Lezhë and uncle of Pal Dukagjini (second marriage)
Maria, unknown mother, married Filippo di Maramonte
Niketa Thopia, unknown mother, married a daughter of Komnen Arianiti, one daughter
Mara, married Balša III in 1407 (divorced by 1412), one daughter
Jelena Thopia Balšić
Unknown (possibly George/Giorgio), no issue
Andrea Thopia
Unknown, one son
Tanush Thopia, nephew of Andrea

References

 
13th-century Albanian people
14th-century Albanian people
15th-century Albanian people
Albanian Roman Catholics
League of Lezhë